Juan Carlos Fresnadillo (born 5 December 1967) is a Spanish film director, script writer, and producer. He directed Intacto and 28 Weeks Later, the sequel to Danny Boyle's 28 Days Later. His film Esposados was nominated for the Academy Award for Best Live Action Short Film in 1996.

Biography

Early life
Fresnadillo was born in Santa Cruz de Tenerife, Canary Islands. In 1977, at the age of nine, he witnessed the aftermath of the Tenerife airport disaster, which in part inspired his 2001 film Intacto. In 1985, Fresnadillo moved to Madrid.

Movie career
He started out in photography and cinema studies and then began his career in short films. In 1987 he set up a production company which produced several short films and commercials. Fresnadillo went on to become a production assistant for Gustavo Fuertes' short film El juicio final (1991) (U.S. title The Final Judgement).

In 1996 he made his directorial debut with the black-and-white short film Esposados (U.S. title: Linked), for which he was also the executive producer. This black comedy tells the story of a couple who are constantly fighting over money; when they find themselves winning the Christmas lottery, however, they have such different ideas about what to do next that the husband tries to get rid of his wife. Esposados won 40 national and international awards. It was also nominated for an Academy Award for Best Short Film in the same year, making Fresnadillo an overnight star in Spain.

In 2000 he received a Goya Award for Best Short Film. In 2002 he directed his first full-length picture, the thriller Intacto. The film received several awards, most notably two 2002 Goya Awards (one of them for Fresnadillo in the category of Best New Director) and six further Goya nominations.

Fresnadillo then completed the 3-minute black-and-white picture Psicotaxi (2002), starring and portraying Alejandro Jodorowsky.

In 2006 he directed 28 Weeks Later, the sequel to Danny Boyle's 2002 film 28 Days Later.

On 7 April 2011 it was announced that he would be directing and co-writing the screenplay for the remake of The Crow. In October 2011 news broke that Fresnadillo was no longer attached to the Crow remake.

On 25 August 2014 Variety reported that Fresnadillo was in talks to develop and possibly direct a thriller titled “The Last Witness” about the lone survivor of a bomb attack in Boston.

In November 2020, he was attached to direct the Millie Bobby Brown movie Damsel.

Filmography
Short film

Feature film

Television

See also
 List of Spanish Academy Award winners and nominees

References

External links

1967 births
Living people
People from Santa Cruz de Tenerife
Film directors from the Canary Islands
Horror film directors
Spanish expatriates in the United Kingdom
21st-century Spanish screenwriters